Vaptsarov Peak rises to approximately 410 m in Delchev Ridge, Tangra Mountains, eastern Livingston Island in the South Shetland Islands, Antarctica.  The peak has steep and ice free western slopes, and surmounts Ihtiman Hook to the northwest and Sopot Ice Piedmont to the east, north and west.

The peak is named after the famous Bulgarian poet Nikola Vaptsarov (1909–42).

Location

Vaptsarov Peak in popular culture
The cover of the VA album Under Heaven: Vinson Massif (2010) actually features a photo not of Vinson Massif but of eastern Tangra Mountains instead, with Mugla Passage and Vaptsarov Peak in the foreground, and Elena Peak (left) and Delchev Peak (right) in the background.  Both the picture and the misidentification may have possibly originated in the ‘Vinson Massif’ entry of the ‘Seven Summits Quest’ website.

Maps
 L.L. Ivanov et al., Antarctica: Livingston Island and Greenwich Island, South Shetland Islands (from English Strait to Morton Strait, with illustrations and ice-cover distribution), 1:100000 scale topographic map, Antarctic Place-names Commission of Bulgaria, Sofia, 2005
 L.L. Ivanov. Antarctica: Livingston Island and Greenwich, Robert, Snow and Smith Islands. Scale 1:120000 topographic map. Troyan: Manfred Wörner Foundation, 2010.  (First edition 2009. )
 Antarctic Digital Database (ADD). Scale 1:250000 topographic map of Antarctica. Scientific Committee on Antarctic Research (SCAR). Since 1993, regularly upgraded and updated.
 L.L. Ivanov. Antarctica: Livingston Island and Smith Island. Scale 1:100000 topographic map. Manfred Wörner Foundation, 2017.

Notes

References
 Vaptsarov Peak. SCAR Composite Antarctic Gazetteer
 Bulgarian Antarctic Gazetteer. Antarctic Place-names Commission. (details in Bulgarian, basic data in English)

External links
 Vaptsarov Peak. Copernix satellite image

Tangra Mountains